Klaus Johann Jacobs (3 December 1936 – 11 September 2008) was a German-born billionaire in the  coffee  and chocolate industry, with Swiss citizenship.

Biography

Early life an education
He was born on 3 December 1936 in Bremen, Germany.
Jacobs attended the University of Hamburg and later Stanford University.

Career
He started his career in the global coffee and chocolates industries.

 In 1962, he became Director of Purchasing and Marketing for the Jacobs AG coffee business.
 In 1972 he became General Manager of the company.
 In 1982, the company merged with Interfood to create Jacobs Suchard AG, Europe's number one chocolate and coffee business.
 In 1987, Jacobs expanded his business in North America with acquisition of Brach's.
 In 1990, when most of the consumer-oriented elements of Jacobs Suchard were sold to Philip Morris, Jacobs created with Brach's and non-consumer businesses of Jacobs Suchard a company which is now known as Barry Callebaut. Barry Callebaut is today the world's largest raw chocolate producer.
 In 1991, Jacobs became also involved with the human resource services industry with the acquisition of Adia Personnel Services where he led the company to a Global Fortune 500 Company following the merger with Ecco in 1996 to form Adecco.

Philanthropy
The Jacobs Foundation was established by Klaus J. Jacobs in December, 1988, in Zurich, Switzerland. In 2001, the founder surrendered his entire share of the Jacobs Holding AG to the Jacobs Foundation, with an effective value of CHF 1.5 billion (31.12.08 CHF 2.3 billion). The Jacobs Foundation's goal is to contribute to Productive Youth Development by bringing together basic research, application and intervention projects and through dialogue and network building. The Jacobs Foundation supports research and projects worldwide. Klaus J. Jacobs donated EUR 200 million to the Jacobs University Bremen in 2006.

Death
He died on 11 September 2008 in Küsnacht, Switzerland.

Memberships
World Scout Foundation
President of the Friends of the Hohe Tauern National Park from 1996-1998
Board of Directors of the Zurich Opera House since 2003
Board of the Association of the Friends of Bayreuth

Decorations and awards
 2005: Honorary doctor of the Faculty of Psychology of the University of Basel
 2005: Education Award of the College of Education Zurich for educational and youth projects
 16 April 2008: Bremen Gold Medal of Honour for services rendered to the benefit of the city of Bremen
 2008: Leibniz Medal of the Berlin-Brandenburg Academy of Sciences for his contributions to the advancement of science
 1999: Silver World Award of the Boy Scouts of America
 2005-2008: Bronze Wolf Award of the World Scout Committee
 1991: Grand Gold Decoration for Services to the Republic of Austria
 2000: Austrian Cross of Honour for Science and Art, 1st class

Klaus J. Jacobs Awards
The Klaus J. Jacobs Research Award honours outstanding achievement in child and youth development and the Klaus J. Jacobs Best Practice Award for positive development of children and youth are awarded annually in memory of  Jacobs. The first award ceremony took place on 3 December 2009. The awards are given by the Jacobs Foundation of Zurich.

Background 
The prizes are given to honour outstanding achievements in research and practice that make a significant contribution to young people’s success in life and development.

The Klaus J. Jacobs Research Award 
The Klaus J. Jacobs Research Award recognises academic research of significant social relevance for child and youth development. Additionally, research findings from the interdisciplinary projects thus honoured should be suited to active practical implementation. The prize money for the award comes to one million Swiss Francs, which can be used for an academic project chosen by the recipient.

The award winner is chosen by a jury of internationally respected researchers: Albert Bandura (Stanford University, USA), Monique Boekaerts (Leiden University, the Netherlands), Jeanne Brooks-Gunn (Columbia University, USA), Anne C. Petersen Michigan University, USA), Meinrad Paul Perrez (Université de Fribourg, Switzerland), Rainer K. Silbereisen (Friedrich Schiller Universität Jena, Germany) and William Julius Wilson (Harvard University, USA).

The Klaus J. Jacobs Best Practice Award 
The Klaus J. Jacobs Best Practice Award is given for exceptional engagement by an institution or individual whose practical work makes real use of innovative ideas for the positive development of children and youth. The prize money amounts to 200,000 Swiss Francs which can be used for a project chosen by the recipient.

The award winner of the Best Practice Award is chosen by the board of the Jacobs Foundation.

References

External links
Jacobs Foundation

1936 births
2008 deaths
Businesspeople from Bremen
University of Hamburg alumni
Businesspeople in the drink industry
Stanford University alumni
Swiss chocolatiers
Swiss billionaires
German expatriates in Switzerland
Businesspeople in coffee
Deaths from cancer in Switzerland
Recipients of the Bronze Wolf Award
Recipients of the Grand Decoration for Services to the Republic of Austria
Recipients of the Austrian Cross of Honour for Science and Art, 1st class